Prélude, Choral et Fugue, FWV 21 is a work for solo piano written in 1884 by César Franck.  This work is an exemplar of Franck's distinctive use of cyclic form.

Structure 

As the name implies, it comprises three movements: a prelude, a chorale and a fugue.  The interconnectedness and thematic relationships (particularly the cyclic recall of the Prelude and Chorale in the Fugue) make this an unorthodox example of double-function form.

It uses a Chromatic fourth motif in the Chorale and the Fugue. The Prelude starts in B minor. The Fugue returns to B minor, but ends in B major.

In popular culture

The work plays a prominent part in the soundtrack of the film Vaghe stelle dell'orsa... (aka Sandra or Of a Thousand Delights), directed by Luchino Visconti and starring Claudia Cardinale.

References

External links
 

Compositions by César Franck
Compositions for solo piano
Franck
Fugues
1884 compositions
Compositions in B minor